ECAS Theater is a non-profit theater in Providence, Rhode Island. It is located in the historic Elmwood neighborhood. ECAS Theater has been the state's leading Latino theater and performing arts organization since 1997. ECAS Theater is dedicated to helping children, teens and adults discover the performing arts and embrace their rich multicultural heritage in an educational context.

History
ECAS Theater has been the Rhode Island's leading Latino theater and performing arts organization since 1997. ECAS Theater is dedicated to helping children, teens and adults discover the performing arts and embrace their rich multicultural heritage in an educational context. ECAS Theater was founded in 1997 as part of an arts and education collaborative created by Providence public school teachers. The Educational Center for the Arts and Science was a multidisciplinary approach to after school and weekend programming for students in Providence. Over the years, ECAS Theater grew to produce and stage original and classic works of theater, provide theatrical instruction to youth and adults, and bring top-rated theater companies from across the US and Latin America to Rhode Island.

ECAS Theater operates a 50-seat black box theater and community arts space located at 57 Parkis Avenue in Providence. Its founding artistic director was Francis Parra.

References

External links
Official website (Spanish)

1997 establishments in Rhode Island
Theatres in Rhode Island